Cope India Exercise are a series of international Air Force exercises between the Indian Air Force and the United States Air Force conducted on and over Indian soil. The first such exercise, which required many months of preparation, was conducted at the air force station in Gwalior from February 16 through February 27, 2004, with the US Air Force withdrawing troops and aircraft on February 27. The exercise included flight tests, practice and demonstrations as well as lectures on subjects related to aviation. There were also media functions and social interactions among troops of the two countries. After the event was over, the Indian Air Force indicated that "[t]he mutual respect and bonhomie that developed between members of the two sides have cemented a firm foundation for moving ahead towards higher bilateralism." According to press reports, representatives of the United States found it a "positive experience" that led to the re-evaluation of some assumptions about US air tactics. The exercise was repeated in 2005, 2006, 2009 and 2018.

Though the results of the later exercises are not available, as per reports, first two of the exercises were won by IAF, with Indian pilots scoring 90% in the 2004 exercise. The pilots of the USAF, who participated in the exercise disclosed that their weakness was that they underestimated the Indian pilots and assumed they would use conventional Cold War tactics, but in reality, they were much more 'unpredictable'. Neither of the sides used or allowed the use of beyond visual range (BVR) armament. This was most probably, because both sides did not wish to disclose their BVR capability and keep it a secret. The Indian planes included the Su-30K which had been used by the IAF while awaiting induction of the MKI. The exercises allowed US pilots to go up against Russian Su-30 and French Mirages.

These same U.S. participants say the Indian pilots showed innovation and flexibility in their tactics. They also admit that they came into the exercise underrating the training and tactics of the pilots they faced. Instead of typical Cold War-style, ground-controlled interceptions, the Indians varied aircraft mixes, altitudes and formations. Indian Air Force planners never reinforced failure or repeated tactics that the U.S. easily repelled. Moreover, the IAF's airborne commanders changed tactics as opportunities arose. Nor did U.S. pilots believe they faced only India's top guns. Instead, they said that at least in some units they faced a mix of experienced and relatively new Indian fighter and strike pilots. In Cope India 2018, Col Daryl Insley of USAF said while they learn from the IAF, the Indian force also learns from them. Commending the IAF's professionalism, he said, "Their capabilities are equal to how we operate".

References

Military exercises involving the United States
United States Air Force military education and training
Indian Air Force
Recurring events established in 2004
India–United States military relations
Military of India